Kim Soo-Kyung (Hangul: 김수경, Hanja: 金秀京) (born August 20, 1979) is a South Korean pitcher who plays for the Nexen Heroes in the KBO League.

He is a right-handed pitcher and was part of the South Korean baseball team which won the bronze medal and was strike-out championship in 1999. He was present at the Hyundai Unicorns's win at 2000, achieving 18 wins.

External links 
 Career statistics from Korea Baseball Organization
 profile

Kiwoom Heroes coaches
South Korean baseball coaches
Baseball players at the 2000 Summer Olympics
Olympic bronze medalists for South Korea
Olympic baseball players of South Korea
Kiwoom Heroes players
Hyundai Unicorns players
KBO League pitchers
South Korean baseball players
1979 births
Living people
Olympic medalists in baseball
Sportspeople from Incheon
Medalists at the 2000 Summer Olympics
South Korean Buddhists